Bob Booker (born August 1, 1931) is an American writer and producer of television shows and record albums. He is best known for producing the 1962 album The First Family with Earle Doud. The album is a parody of President John F. Kennedy and his family, and it both remained at #1 on the Billboard 200 for 12 weeks and won a Grammy for Best Album of the Year in 1963.

Early career 

Booker was born in Jacksonville, Florida, and graduated from high school at age of 16. He was first employed as a local radio DJ. A new television station began operation and Booker was hired at the age of 18, where he worked as a TV host, news anchor, weatherman, camera operator, set builder, film editor, program producer and director. He was later drafted into the army during the Korean conflict and was stationed at Ft. Bliss in El Paso. Because of his background in radio and television, he was placed on staff for the commanding general, doing PR for the base. Discharged after two years, he moonlighted as a talent manager and became station manager of WIVY in Jacksonville.

In 1958, Booker was hired by Miami's WINZ AM radio for their afternoon drive slot. He ingratiated himself with all the top entertainers who frequented the popular winter vacation spot through one-on-one interviews. Celebrities like Jack Benny, Nat Cole, Martha Ray, Andy Williams, Ray Charles, Mort Sahl, Ava Gardner, Gloria DeHaven, Sinatra - many became lifelong friends. He also did on-air work at two local TV stations, and hosted weekend shows. In 1960, he left Miami and relocated to New York City.

New York City 

Booker discovered it was not easy to start a career in the Big Apple, as an MCA agent got him exactly one TV pilot hosting job in one year. He made friends with local writers, including Pat McCormick (who later wrote for Johnny Carson) and Earle Doud. He and Doud began some writing projects, which included a series of gag record greeting cards, an article for Playboy magazine and their ultimate brainchild: a comedy album spoofing the President of the United States.

Booker and Doud cast Vaughn Meader, who they saw via the Talent Scouts TV show, as JFK and Naomi Brossart, a model and actress, as Jackie. They cut a demo record and made their first pitch to Capitol Records. After hearing the demo, an executive and friend of Booker, said: “I wouldn’t touch it with a 10-foot pole!” Dejected, the two considered other labels and ended up at ABC Records who referred them to ABC President Leonard Goldenson. He passed, but suggested a small record label, Cadence Records, owned by Archie Bleyer. He liked the concept and signed the two writers to a record deal.

On October 22, 1962, The First Family was recorded at Fine Studios in New York City, ironically at the same moment that President Kennedy announced the naval blockade of Soviet Union ships traveling to Cuba, prompting the Cuban Missile Crisis. Once the crisis was over, Booker and Doud devised a simple plan to market their record: radio airplay. Booker also worked part-time for 1010 WINS AM and when the first albums were delivered to Cadence, the two immediately sought out the most popular DJ in the city, Stan Z. Burns at WINS. Burns loved the record and The First Family was the only record he played for his entire three-hour shift. The WINS switchboard lit up with callers — listeners, news outlets and competing radio stations — everyone wanted the new record. Booker and Doud, who came armed with a handful of records, traveled around the city, dropping off albums to numerous radio stations. Booker remembered it best: “Lightning had struck...we were in the right place at the right time.” It would become the fastest selling album in record history.

Arthur M Schlesinger Jr., Assistant to the President, nearly crashed his car when he first heard an album cut on the radio: Reporter: What do you think the chances are for a Jewish president? Meader: Well, I think they're pretty good. Let me say, I don't see why a person of the Jewish faith can't be President of the United States. I know as a Catholic I could never vote for him, but other than that...

Booker and Doud produced a second album, The First Family Volume Two, in the spring of 1963. After President Kennedy was assassinated that November, all unsold albums were pulled out of stores and destroyed. The producers did not want to appear to be profiting from the President's death.

Later career 

Booker continued to produce albums with George Foster, including the very successful 1965 album You Don't Have To Be Jewish and When You're In Love, the Whole World is Jewish. He produced 16 comedy albums from 1962 to 1977.

Booker wrote for The Garry Moore Show during the late 1960s and also contributed to The Ed Sullivan Show, as well as other variety programs. When Hollywood came calling, he relocated to Los Angeles and worked in the motion picture industry for a few years. He returned to television and produced numerous TV shows from the 1970s to the 1990s, including The NBC Follies and Fifty Years of Country Music. He partnered with Burt Reynolds, producing two network pilot specials: Cotton Club '75 and The Wayne Newton Special. In 1977, Paramount hired him to create television specials to promote their feature film releases American Hot Wax, Foul Play and Grease. In 1987, Booker created the NBC teen fantasy sitcom Out of this World starring Maureen Flannigan and Donna Pescow. He produced numerous “outtake” shows and established an extensive comedy videotape library for his shows Foul-Ups, Bleeps & Blunders with Don Rickles and Steve Lawrence, Comedy Break and The Hit Squad. He would continue to market the TV library globally for decades.

Personal life 

Booker donated many of his personal television scripts to the Writers Guild Foundation Archive. The original master tapes of his albums The First Family and The First Family Volume Two were donated to President John F. Kennedy's library in Boston at the request of Caroline Kennedy and are on display in the library, along with a Gold Album of the first album.

He is now retired, living in Northern California with his wife of 51 years, Barbara Noonan Booker, who partnered and co-produced with her husband with programming on the four major networks and in syndication. They have two children and four grandchildren.

Album work 

A partial list of his album credits:

You Don't Have to be Jewish (1964)
When You're in Love, the Whole World is Jewish (1965)
Al Tijuana & His Jewish Brass (1966)
The Yiddish are Coming! The Yiddish are Coming! (1967)
Scream On Someone You Love Today (1967)The New First Family 1968: A Futuristic Fairy Tale (1968)Beware of Greeks Bearing Gifts (1968)The Handwriting On The Wall (The Sounds Of Graffiti) (1968)Pat McCormick Tells It Like It Is (1968)The Jewish American Princess (1971)Out of the Closet (1977)

 Television work 

A partial list of his television credits:The NBC Follies (1973)Cotton Club '75 (1974)Charo (1976)Fifty Years of Country Music (1978)Grease Day USA (1978)Waylon (1980)The Best Little Special in Texas (1982)The Funniest Commercial Goofs (1983)Foul-Ups, Bleeps & Blunders (1983-84)The Love Boat Fall Preview Special (1984)Anything for a Laugh (1985)Comedy Break (1985)Rickles on the Loose (1986)The Hit Squad (1987)Out of this World'' (1987)

References

Living people
1931 births
Writers from Jacksonville, Florida
Record producers from Florida
American radio DJs
Television producers from Florida